Donald Leslie Shaw (February 11, 1930 – January 30, 2017 in Italy) was a writer, literary critic and the Brown-Forman Professor of Latin American Literature at the University of Virginia.
	
He graduated from the University of Manchester (B.A., M.A.) and  the University of Dublin (Ph.D.). He lived in Italy, spending each academic semester in Charlottesville, Virginia.

He wrote several books, including A Literary History of Spain: The Nineteenth Century and A companion to modern Spanish American fiction Woodbridge, Suffolk, UK ; Rochester, N.Y. : Tamesis, 2002. . Also, he wrote The generation of 1898 in Spain, London, E. Benn, 1975. He wrote extensively on, and taught a course about, Argentine writer Jorge Luis Borges.

Shaw died on January 30, 2017, in Bologna, Italy.

References

1930 births
University of Virginia faculty
Writers from Manchester
Latin Americanists
2017 deaths